The Grey and Bell by-election 1856 was a by-election held in the  electorate during the 2nd New Zealand Parliament, on 14 October 1856, and was, along with the Christchurch Country , the second equal contested by-election in New Zealand political history.

The by-election was caused by the resignation of incumbent MP Charles Brown and was won by John Lewthwaite. On nomination day (13 October) John Lewthwaite and Mr R. Pheney were nominated, and after a second show of hands in favour of Lewthwaite, Pheney demanded a poll. John Lewthwaite was subsequently elected the following day.

Results

References

Grey and Bell 1856
1856 elections in New Zealand
Politics of Taranaki